The Space is an arts space in Millwall on the Isle of Dogs, London. Its principal patron is Sir Ian McKellen, and it is a registered non-profit making charity.

History 
The Space is located inside a former Presbyterian church. Dedicated to St Paul, this was built in 1859 for the Scottish Presbyterian congregation who had migrated to the Isle of Dogs to work in the shipyards. It was designed by Thomas Knightley. It was taken over by the St. Paul's Arts Trust, headed by Robert Richardson, in 1989, and has been restored.

Performances 
The Space offers many kinds of performance, including dance, drama and live music. Its first in-house production was a double bill of Dogg's Hamlet and The Real Inspector Hound, the former starring Adam Hemming (the theatre's artistic director) as the headmaster. It produces its own shows with in house production company Space Productions. The Space supports new and emerging artists who are fresh out of drama school, or anyone looking to put on their first show. Les Enfants Terribles, Nick Helm, Ian Mcklellen and Mitch Benn have all frequented The Space.

Facilities 
Hubbub is the restaurant/bar located above The Space.

The Space has established itself as a community theatre, it is staffed mainly by volunteers.

References 

Theatres in the London Borough of Tower Hamlets
Millwall
Former churches in London